This is a list of songs which have topped the UK Independent Singles Breakers Chart during the 2010s.
The Independent record labels given are the ones listed by the official charts.

Number ones

By artist

35 artists have spent four or more weeks at the top of the chart during the 2010s.

By record label
, thirty two record labels have spent four or more weeks at the top of the chart so far during the 2010s.

References

External links
 UK Independent Singles Breakers Chart at the Official Charts Company

Indie Breakers 2010s
2010s in British music
United Kingdom Indie Breakers